The Fourteenth Texas Legislature met from January 13, 1874 to March 15, 1875 in two regular sessions. All members of the House of Representatives and about half of the members of the Senate were elected in 1873.

Sessions
14th First regular session: January 13–May 4, 1874
14th Second regular session: January 12–March 15, 1875

Party summary

Officers

Senate
 Lieutenant Governor
 Richard Bennett Hubbard, Jr.
 President pro tempore (Lieutenant Governor ex officio)
 Edward Bradford Pickett, Democrat

House of Representatives
 Speaker of the House
 Guy Morrison Bryan, Democrat

Members
Members of the Fourteenth Texas Legislature as of the beginning of the Regular Session, January 13, 1874:

Senate

 Benjamin Cromwell Franklin was elected, but died on December 25, 1873, 2½ weeks before the start of the Regular Session.

House of Representatives

David Abner, Sr.
Decimus et Ultimus Barziza
Thomas Beck
Joseph Brown
Ed Brown
Guy Morrison Bryan
John Hughes Cochran
William Shelby Delaney
James Eastland
Lochlin Johnson Farrar
Jacob E. Freeman
James L. German
James Marshall Harrison
Thomas Hayes
John Mitchell
William Wilson Patrick, Robertson County
Frank Rainey
Meshack Roberts
Lieuen Morgan Rogers
Felix Ezell Smith
Charles Bellinger Tate Stewart
William Jesse Swain
John Files Tom
George Pickett
William Amos Wortham

Membership Changes

 District 16: Shepard elected in special election February 17, 1874, seated March 26, 1874 after election contest with Matthew Gaines

External links

14 Texas Legislature
1874 in Texas
1875 in Texas
1874 U.S. legislative sessions
1875 U.S. legislative sessions